Bodrigan is a house near Wenford in the Camel Valley, north Cornwall.

References

Houses in Cornwall